Wild Geese is a 1927 American silent drama film directed by Phil Goldstone and starring Belle Bennett and Russell Simpson. Based upon the 1925 novel of the same name by Martha Ostenso, it was distributed by Tiffany-Stahl Pictures.

Cast

Preservation
With no prints of Wild Geese located in any film archives, it is a lost film.

See also
The Cry of the Wild Geese (1961)

References

External links
 
 

1927 films
American silent feature films
Lost American films
Tiffany Pictures films
American black-and-white films
Films set in the 1880s
Films set in Manitoba
Films based on Canadian novels
Films directed by Phil Goldstone
1927 lost films
1920s American films
1920s English-language films